David Bustos González (born 25 August 1990) is a Spanish runner who specializes in the 800 metres and 1500 metres races.

Personal life
Bustos first played hockey and football, and trained in swimming. He took up athletics only in high school, and focused on running in 2005. He has a degree in business administration from the Open University of Catalonia. He is married to Talania Buria Garcia.

Career
In the 1500 metres he finished fourth at the 2007 World Youth Championships and competed at the 2008 World Junior Championships without reaching the final. In the 800 metres he won the gold medal at the 2009 European Junior Championships, and competed at the 2010 World Indoor Championships without reaching the final.

His personal best 800 metres time indoors is 1:47.05 minutes, achieved at the 2010 World Indoor Championships in Doha. His outdoor 800 m personal best is 1:46.12 set in Barakaldo.  He has a personal best time of 3:34.77 minutes in the 1500 metres, achieved in June 2012 in Huelva.

Achievements

References

1990 births
Living people
Spanish male middle-distance runners
Sportspeople from Palma de Mallorca
Athletes (track and field) at the 2012 Summer Olympics
Athletes (track and field) at the 2016 Summer Olympics
Olympic athletes of Spain
European Athletics Championships medalists
World Athletics Championships athletes for Spain
21st-century Spanish people